John Robert Gebert (born 1 April 1944, Adelaide) is an Australian jazz pianist. The Bobby Gebert Trio (with Jonathan Zwartz on double bass and Andrew Dickeson on drums) was nominated for the 1995 ARIA Award for Best Jazz Album with The Sculptor.

Biography 

John Robert Gebert was born in 1944 in Adelaide. He was trained on piano and studied at London's College of Music before returning to Australia to start his career as a jazz musician. In 1987 he was the pianist for Bernie McGann Quartet for the album, Kindred Spirits, alongside McGann on saxophone, John Pochee on drums and Jonathan Zwartz on double bass.

In 1992 Gebert, Zwartz and Andrew Dickeson on drums backed visiting English saxophonist, Ronnie Scott, for his performances in Australia. Michael Foster of The Canberra Times felt Scott, "was obviously as comfortable with Bobby Gebert's trio as the three Sydney musicians were with him, even on first encounter. This made for a great evening..."

In 1994 Bobby Gebert Trio issued a studio album, The Sculptor, via ABC Music. Foster noticed that Gebert, "can play in many idioms, but is particularly appealing, to me at least, in this mode and mood." He described the tracks, "[it] opens with Gebert's own 'The Sculptor' and he seamlessly blends his own tunes,
'MD. Waltz for Helen' and 'Mo' Blues', with Monk's 'Off Minor', Strayhorn's 'Lotus Blossum', Ellington's 'Reflections in D' and 'Come Sunday', and Hope's 'Something for Kenny'." At the ARIA Music Awards of 1995 it was nominated for Best Jazz Album.

Discography

Albums

Awards

ARIA Music Awards
The ARIA Music Awards is an annual awards ceremony that recognises excellence, innovation, and achievement across all genres of Australian music. It commenced in 1987.

|-
| 1995
| The Sculptor (as Bobby Gebert Trio)
| Best Jazz Album
| 
|-

Mo Awards
The Australian Entertainment Mo Awards (commonly known informally as the Mo Awards), were annual Australian entertainment industry awards. They recognise achievements in live entertainment in Australia from 1975 to 2016. Bobby Gebert won two awards in that time.
 (wins only)
|-
|rowspan="2"| 1993 
| Bobby Gebert Trio
| Jazz Group of the Year 
| 
|-
| Bobby Gebert
| Jazz Performer of the Year 
| 
|-

References

1944 births
Living people
Australian musicians
Australian jazz musicians